Mogot is a rural locality (a settlement) and the administrative center of Mogotsky Selsoviet of Tyndinsky District, Amur Oblast, Russia. The population was 632 as of 2018. There are 8 streets.

Geography 
Mogot is located on the Mogot River, 60 km north of Tynda (the district's administrative centre) by road. Bestuzhevo is the nearest rural locality.

References 

Rural localities in Tyndinsky District